Phalacrotophora longifrons is a species of scuttle flies (insects in the family Phoridae).

References

Further reading

 

Phoridae
Articles created by Qbugbot
Insects described in 1906
Diptera of North America
Taxa named by Charles Thomas Brues